Christopher "Choppy" Close (born 5 February 1959) is an Australian former professional rugby league footballer who played in the 1970s, 1980s and 1990s. A robust three-quarter back, he represented Australia internationally and Queensland in State of Origin, and played club football in Queensland and New South Wales. Close has the distinction of being one of a handful of players to be named man-of-the-match in State of Origin more than once. In fact the first two State of Origin man-of-the-match awards went to him.

Playing career

Queensland Rugby League
Hailing from Cunnamulla, Queensland, where he started playing football in the 1970s. Close lived in Proston,Queensland playing for his junior rugby league for the Wondai Wolves. Close scored 52 tries during the 1978  season. Chris played his first A Grade game for the Beaudesert Kingfishers before joining Brisbane Rugby League premiership club, Valleys. He also played for Fortitude Valley at centre in their 1979 Brisbane Rugby League grand final victory over Souths.

In 1980, while playing for Redcliffe, Close was chosen on the Australian tour of New Zealand but it was his consecutive man-of-the-match performances in the first two State of Origin matches in 1980 and 1981 that turned heads. He was a fierce competitor, as his back-hander to the face of opposing winger Eric Grothe in 1981's State of Origin match testifies.

New South Wales Rugby League
Close signed with Manly-Warringah for the  1982 NSWRFL season and played in the Grand Final with them that year and again in 1983, which were both lost to Parramatta. Close continued to be a regular visitor to the State of Origin arena during the 1980s, becoming one of a handful of players to be man-of-the-match in State of Origin football more than once.

Surprisingly, after starring for Queensland, having toured New Zealand with the Australian team in 1980 and having played in Manly's Grand Final loss to Parramatta, Close was not selected to the 1982 Kangaroo Tour of Great Britain and France.

Close appeared in three Tests on the 1985 tour of New Zealand but failed to tour with the Kangaroos the following year.

After playing in Manly's reserve grade grand final loss in 1987, he linked with the newly formed Gold Coast club where his experience was used to good effect in the forwards.

Post-playing
After his retirement as a player, Close filled the role of Queensland State of Origin team manager under Paul Vautin (1995–97), Wayne Bennett (1998 & 2001-4) and Mark Murray (1999-00).  In 2005, he famously stuck the middle finger up at former NSW coach Phil Gould at the end of an origin match.  When asked about the incident in 2015, Close said "That was basically directed at one person not the whole bench, I got a great deal of enjoyment out of that, he used to call The Queensland spirit a myth and claimed we were always lucky, that was just euphoria coming out in that moment. In 2000 Close was awarded the Australian Sports Medal for his contribution to Australia's international standing in rugby league. He is currently working for QGC in Queensland as a Land Performance Adviser.

Close also lived in Rockhampton, Queensland for several years where he owned the Lionleigh Tavern in the suburb of Wandal, which became known for award winning steaks under Close's ownership.  During the time he lived in Rockhampton, he and his wife spent 18 months restoring a five-bedroom, four-bathroom Queenslander in the city's upper class suburb of The Range, which was expected to set a $2 million sale record when it was placed on the market in 2011.

Sources

External links

Chris Close at nrlstats.com
Chris Close at yesterdayshero.com.au
Queensland Representatives at qrl.com.au

1959 births
Living people
Australia national rugby league team players
Fortitude Valley Diehards players
Gold Coast Chargers players
Hull Kingston Rovers players
Manly Warringah Sea Eagles players
People from Cunnamulla
Queensland Rugby League State of Origin players
Recipients of the Australian Sports Medal
Redcliffe Dolphins players
Rugby league centres
Rugby league players from Queensland
Rugby league props
Rugby league wingers